Cornelius Coe (born September 17, 1975) is a former American football defensive specialist who played four seasons in the Arena Football League (AFL) with the Indiana Firebirds and Los Angeles Avengers. He played college football at Northern Michigan University. He was also a member of the Quad City Steamwheelers and Peoria Pirates.

Early years
Coe participated in football and wrestling at William Howard Taft High School in Chicago, Illinois.

College career
Coe played college football for the Northern Michigan Wildcats. He recorded career totals of 291 tackles and ten interceptions as a four-year letterman for the Northern Michigan Wildcats. He was also a two-time ALL-MIFC Defense First Team selection and twice named Northern Michigan’s Outstanding Defensive Back. Coe led the Wildcats in tackles his senior year with 102, including 13 for losses.

Professional career
Coe played for the Quad City Steamwheelers of the af2 in 2000. He had earlier played for the Peoria Pirates of the Indoor Football League. He helped the 19-0 Steamwheelers win ArenaCup I. Coe was named af2 Defensive Player of the Year after leading the league with 169 tackles and also leading with six fumble recoveries. He was tied for third in the af2 with nine interceptions and second with three forced fumbles. He signed with the AFL's Indiana Firebirds on January 22, 2001. Coe played for the Firebirds from 2001 to 2002, earning Second Team All-Arena and All-Rookie Team honors in 2001. He was signed by the Los Angeles Avengers of the AFL on March 15, 2003. He was placed on the left the squad list on February 20, 2004. Coe was released by the Avengers on November 24, 2004.

Personal life
Coe was charged with multiple cocaine-related felony counts in February 2004.

References

External links
Just Sports Stats

Living people
1975 births
Players of American football from Chicago
American football defensive backs
African-American players of American football
Northern Michigan Wildcats football players
Peoria Pirates players
Quad City Steamwheelers players
Indiana Firebirds players
Los Angeles Avengers players
21st-century African-American sportspeople
20th-century African-American sportspeople